Solo, in comics, may refer to:

 Solo (DC Comics), a DC comics series
 Solo (Marvel Comics), a Marvel comics character
 Solo (Dark Horse Comics), a 1996 mini-series from Dark Horse Comics
 Han Solo, a character who has appeared in numerous comic book adaptations of Star Wars
 Sky Solo, a character from Alan Moore's series 1963
 Solo Avengers, a Marvel Comics series

See also
Solo (disambiguation)

References